Bochkov is a Russian masculine surname, its feminine counterpart is Bochkova. It may refer to
Andrei Bochkov (born 1982), Russian football player
Nikita Bochkov (born 1991), Russian figure skater 
Sergey Bochkov (born 1979), Azerbaijani triple jumper

Russian-language surnames